HTR High Tech Racing is a video game by Brazilian studio QUByte Interactive for Microsoft Windows, Android, iOS, and soon Nintendo 3DS.

Gameplay
The player can customize various aspects of the game, including their car and their track. There are 16 tracks in game with the option to download other tracks as well, including those developed by the community.

References

2010 video games
Windows games
IOS games
Android (operating system) games
Nintendo 3DS games
MacOS games
PlayStation Vita games
Racing video games
Video games developed in Brazil